Ananta Basudeba temple is a temple of Lord Krishna in the Hangseshwari temple complex in Banshberia, in the Hooghly District in the Indian state of West Bengal. Built by Raja Rameswar Datta in 1679, this temple is noted for the exquisite terra cotta works on its walls. It is built in the traditional eka-ratna style, with curved cornices. The tower on top of the temple is octagonal. The terracota works depict stories from the great Indian epics Ramayana and Mahabharata, as well as from lilas of Krishna.

References

Krishna temples
Hindu temples in Hooghly district
Buildings and structures in Hooghly district
Tourist attractions in Hooghly district
1679 establishments in Asia